Live at Hammersmith is the second live album by Rick Wakeman. Despite being a 1985 concert, the music performed is from the first three albums (1973–1975). During this show there was a power failure, and Wakeman walked to the front and told jokes for 45 minutes, although had to subsequently pay for running over time as the power had been restored after 3 minutes.

Track listing
"Arthur"    13.02
"Three Wives"    16.55
"Journey"    21.56
"Merlin"   7.37

Song titles
Three of these songs have shorter or altered names: 
Three Wives is a made-up name implying this is a medley of 3 songs from the album The Six Wives of Henry VIII
Journey is short for Journey to the Centre of the Earth
Merlin is short for Merlin the Magician, a song from The Myths and Legends of King Arthur and the Knights of the Round Table

Personnel
Musicians
Rick Wakeman – keyboards
Rick Fenn – guitars
Gordon Neville – lead vocals, percussion 
Tony Fernandez – drums
Chas Cronk – bass

Production
John Acock – mixing
Denis Blackham – mastering

References

1985 live albums
Albums recorded at the Hammersmith Apollo
Progressive rock albums by British artists
Rick Wakeman albums